Nuntiella angustiptera is a species of moth of the family Tortricidae. It is found in Guangxi and Yunnan, China.

References

Moths described in 2004
Eucosmini